The Allentown Cardinals were a minor league baseball team.  Affiliated with the St. Louis Cardinals, they played in the Class B Interstate League between 1944 and 1952; then in the Class A Eastern League from 1954 to 1956.

Allentown had joined the Interstate League in 1939, with the maiden team known as the Dukes. From 1940 through 1943, the club was nicknamed the Allentown Wings and began its affiliation with the Cardinals in 1942.

The Cardinals played at Fairview Field until 1948, when they moved into the new Breadon Field, a steel and concrete stadium that seated 5,000 fans, which was located just north of the city in Whitehall Township.  Poor attendance led to the teams demise after the 1956 season.

Seasons
 Interstate League (Class B)

Did not play in 1953 season
 Eastern League (Class A)

See also

 Sports in Allentown, Pennsylvania
 History of baseball in Allentown, Pennsylvania

Notes

References

  baseball-reference.com (All team and player statistics and teams)

1944 establishments in Pennsylvania
1956 disestablishments in Pennsylvania
Baseball in Allentown, Pennsylvania
Baseball teams disestablished in 1956
Baseball teams established in 1944
Defunct baseball teams in Pennsylvania
Defunct Eastern League (1938–present) teams
Eastern League (1938–present) teams